Metropolitan is an unincorporated community in Humboldt County, California. It is located on McDairmid Prairie, on the north side of the Eel River floodplain three miles downstream of Scotia, at an elevation of 72 feet (22 m).

History 
The location was formerly a company town of 25 homes with a hotel and store for sawmill workers of the Metropolitan Redwood Lumber Company organized in 1904 by owners in Michigan and Wisconsin.  Company timberlands on Slater Creek were reached by a railroad trestle across the Eel River.  The timber was logged out in the 1920s, and the sawmill burned in 1932.  Most of the employee housing was moved to Rio Dell by 1937.  The railway trestle and 62-room hotel were destroyed by the Eel River flood of 23 December 1964.

Metropolitan Redwood Lumber Company Locomotives

References
5. ShayLocomotives.com research site (1998-2017)

Defunct California railroads
Logging railroads in the United States
Company towns in California
Populated places established in 1904
Unincorporated communities in Humboldt County, California
Unincorporated communities in California